The OGAE Second Chance Contest is a visual event which was founded in 1987 and is organised by branches of OGAE, the international fan club of the Eurovision Song Contest.  Four nations competed in the first contest which took place in 1987. The competition was previously a non-televised event, but evolved over the years by the usage of video tape and later DVD, YouTube and streaming services.

Each summer following the Eurovision Song Contest, each branch can enter one song that failed to win the country's national selection process for the contest. The members of each club choose amongst the songs that did not win and select one to represent the club in the event. Votes are cast by members of the OGAE clubs and are returned to the OGAE branch organising the particular year's event. Guest juries have been used to cast votes since 1993.

Background
The contest began in 1987, when it was then known as "Europe's Favourite". The contest quickly expanded and now contains over 20 countries competing each year. Due to the countries' varying Eurovision selection methods over the years, it is a common occurrence for countries to sporadically compete in the contest.

Format
The contest takes place during the summer after the year's Eurovision Song Contest, held in every year.  A video entry from each branch of OGAE is handed to each competing OGAE club.  The votes are then returned to the organising OGAE branch, normally the previous year's winning branch, who then organises the final. The method of voting has developed since the contests interception, from audio-tape in the contest's beginnings to the use of video tape and nowadays by DVD and YouTube.

Previously it had been known for non-televised national final entries to compete in the Second Chance Contest. This occurred from 1989 to 1991 when  entered songs known to have been entered into the country's internal selection process. In 1990, 1991, 1998 and 1999  competed in the Second Chance Contest, entering the winning songs of the Italian Sanremo Music Festival, known to be the basis for the creation of the Eurovision Song Contest. After 1999 a new rule was introduced allowing only songs from televised national finals to compete in the Second Chance Contest. This has led some branches ineligible to compete for many years due to no national final being held in the country. In 1993 guest juries have been used in the voting of the contest. These juries are composed of branches that are ineligible to compete in the contest due to no national final being held in their country.

Participation
Participation in the Second Chance Contest requires competing branches to have had a televised national final held in their country for the year's Eurovision Song Contest. So far 37 countries have been represented at the contest at least once. These are listed here alongside the year in which they made their debut:

Débutantes

OGAE Rest of the World represents countries that do not have an OGAE branch of their own.

Contests

Retrospective Second Chance Contests 
From 2003 it was decided to hold Retrospective Contests each year containing songs from contests prior to 1987. In 2003 the first contest was held, containing songs that failed to compete in the Eurovision Song Contest 1986. This format is repeated every year, for example in 2004 the 1985 Retrospective contest was held, and in 2005 the 1984 Retro contest was held etc. The latest contests to be held were the 1969 contest in 2020.  The next will be the 1968 contest which is scheduled to take place in 2021.

Second Chance Contests 

The contests which are organised between members of international Eurovision Song Contest fan club OGAE to select a song which did not make it to the Eurovision Song Contest through their national finals, giving it a "second chance" opportunity to participate in a competition to determine the favourite entry. Participation in the Second Chance Contest requires competing branches to have had a televised national final held in their country for the year's Eurovision Song Contest. So far 37 countries have been represented at the contest at least once. These are listed here alongside the year in which they made their debut: Ten countries have won the contest over contest history. The most successful country in the contest has been , who have won the contest seventeen times in total, nearly half of the contests held. The Swedish band, Alcazar, who won in 2003 and again in 2005 is the only act to win the contest more than once while Magnus Carlsson (Member of Alcazar in 2003 & 2005 and lead singer of Barbados in 2001) is the only artist who has won thrice.

1980s

Three contests took place in the 1980s, the first being in 1987 which was held in Huizen, the Netherlands, whilst the 1988 and 1989 contest both took place in Östersund, Sweden. Each country selected two songs to compete in the contest. this was the first and only time that each country submitted two songs to the contest (much in the same way as the ). The first ever winner of the contest was Sweden's Arja Saijonmaa with "Högt över havet", which originally came second in the Swedish national final, Melodifestivalen 1987. Norway's Kjersti Bergesen and Marcha from the Netherlands finished in joint second place.

Each country submitted one song that failed to win their national selections for the Eurovision Song Contest 1988. The winner was again Sweden, with the song "Om igen" by Lena Philipsson, which came second in the Swedish national selection for Eurovision Melodifestivalen 1988.

As in 1988, each country had to submit one song that failed to represent them in the Eurovision Song Contest 1989. Runners-up were Lili & Susie for  while 's Andreas Martin came third.

1990s
Ten contests took place in the 1990s, held in eight cities located in four countries. Sweden hosted the contests in Östersund in 1990 and 1991; Örebro in 1995; and Farsta in 1996. Germany's cities of Montabaur, Hanover, and Hamburg played hosts in 1992, 1997, and 1998 respectively. Oslo, Norway hosted the 1993 and 1994 contest; whilst the Netherlands hosted the 1999 contest in Emmen.

The OGAE Second Chance Contest 1990, was the fourth edition, and had fourteen countries competing in the contest. OGAE Italy selected their winning song of the Italian Sanremo Music Festival. The contest was won once again by Sweden, represented by Carola with the song "Mitt i ett äventyr". Carola would go on to win the Eurovision Song Contest 1991 with "Fångad av en stormvind". Arja Saijonmaa who won for Sweden in the 1987 OGAE Second Chance Contest, returned to represent her native country .

Sweden won the contest once again, for the fourth time, represented by Pernilla Wahlgren with the song "Tvillingsjäl". 's Lia Vissi came second, while Israel's Adam came third.

The OGAE Second Chance Contest 1992 was the sixth edition of the contest. Eleven countries participated in the contest, with  entering the contest for the first time, while  and the  returned after their absences the previous year. 's Yaron Chadad came second while 's Patricia Roe came third.

The OGAE Second Chance Contest 1993, was the seventh edition of the contest. In 1993, a pre-selection contest for the main Eurovision Song Contest called Kvalifikacija za Millstreet was held to limit the number of entries into the main Eurovision final – six of the seven countries competing in this Second Chance Contest, sending either their failed entries from the pre-selection, or sending another song from their national final. Alongside the large number of début countries, there were also a number of other changes in the line-up:  could not take part in the contest due to holding an internal selection to select their entry; as well as this  and  returned after being absent last year. This year marked the first use of "Guest Juries" in the contest. These juries, coming from non-competing countries, were allowed to vote alongside the competing countries, allowing them to participate to some degree in the contest. The first guest juries came from France, Germany, Greece, Italy, Luxembourg and Spain. The winner of the contest was Merethe Trøan with "Din egen stjerne", representing host country Norway. The  came second, represented by Ruth Jacott, and the  came third with Sonia.

The OGAE Second Chance Contest 1994 was the eighth edition of the contest. Sixteen countries competed in the contest with  entering the contest for the first time. For the second time "Guest Juries" were used in the contest, allowing OGAE branches from countries who held no national final for Eurovision 1994 to compete in Second Chance.  were the winners of the eighth time in the contest history, represented by singer Gladys del Pilar with "Det vackraste jag vet", a song composed by Michael Saxell with lyrics by Ingela Forsman. The runner-up position went to the 's Frances Ruffelle, while third place was awarded to host country  and Madam Medusa.

The OGAE Second Chance Contest 1995 was the ninth edition of the contest. Furthermore,  did not take part although a national final was being held.  were the winners, represented by singer Cecilia Vennersten with "Det vackraste ", a song composed by Peter & Nanne Grönvall with lyrics by Nanne Grönvall & Maria Rådsten.

The OGAE Second Chance Contest 1996 was the tenth contest. Several countries returned to the contest too, but none of the participants from the 1995 edition, withdrew.  were the winners of the 10th edition of Second Chance, represented by singer Lotta Engberg with "Juliette och Jonathan".

The OGAE Second Chance Contest 1997 was the eleventh edition of the contest. Seventeen countries took part in the contest, organised by OGAE Germany. Italy were crowned the winners of the contest with the song "Storie" by Anna Oxa. This was Italy's first win in Second Chance Contest, and the first win for a non-Scandinavian country. During the voting the seventeen competing entries were joined by five guest juries from Austria, France, Israel, Switzerland and Luxembourg.

The OGAE Second Chance Contest 1998 was the twelfth OGAE Second Chance Contest. Eighteen countries took part in the contest, organised by OGAE Germany in Hamburg, Germany. The  were the winners of the contest with the song "Alsof je bij me bent" by Nurlaila. This was their first win in Second Chance, and the second win for a non-Scandinavian country. During the voting the eighteen competing entries were joined by seven guest juries from Denmark, Austria, Cyprus, France, Spain, Luxembourg and Israel.

The OGAE Second Chance Contest 1999 was the thirteenth edition of the OGAE Second Chance Contest Seventeen countries were originally going to participate in the contest. However,  were disqualified after their votes did not arrive on time. ,  and  all returned after missing the previous year's contest, and  made its Second Chance début. This marked the third year in a row that a non-Scandinavian country had won the contest. The sixteen competing countries were joined in the voting by guest juries from Spain, Austria, Israel, Finland and Switzerland.

2000s

The OGAE Second Chance Contest 2000 was the fourteenth OGAE Second Chance Contest, organised by OGAE Turkey after their win in 1999. The twenty-one competing countries were joined in the voting by six guest juries from Austria, Israel, Luxembourg, Portugal, Italy and Greece. At the end of the voting 's Anna Eriksson was declared the winner with the song "Oot voimani mun", Finland's first (and so far only) victory in the contest. The  came second with Catherine Porter and "Crazy", while  came third with "Sueño su boca" by Raúl.

The OGAE Second Chance Contest 2001 was the fifteenth edition of the OGAE Second Chance Contest. It was organised by OGAE Finland after their win the previous year. This made the host country unable to send an entry to the contest. The twenty competing entries were joined by twelve guest juries in the voting for the winner, coming from the withdrawing countries 
Macedonia, Finland, France, Cyprus, Belgium and Romania and international juries from Poland, New Zealand, Austria, Russia, Italy and Canada. At the end of the voting the winner was 's Barbados with "Allt som jag ser", beating 's Sonia & Selena in second place, and the 's Nanne into third place. This was the first male winner in OGAE Second Chance history, and the eighth win for Sweden.

The OGAE Second Chance Contest 2002 was the sixteenth edition of the contest, and organised by OGAE Sweden following their win in 2001. The eighteen competing entries were joined by seven guest juries in the voting for the winner, coming from France, Luxembourg, Ireland, Portugal, Netherlands, Norway and Turkey. At the end of the voting the winner was 's David Bisbal with "Corazon latino", beating 's winner from OGAE Second Chance Contest 2001, Barbados in second place, and 's Sarit Hadad into third place.

The OGAE Second Chance Contest 2003 was the seventeenth edition of the OGAE Second Chance Contest, and was organised by OGAE Spain following their win the previous year. Twenty countries took part in the contest, held in Las Palmas, Gran Canaria. The competing entries were joined by five guest juries in the voting for the winner, coming from Belgium, Italy, France, Finland and Turkey. At the end of the voting, two countries had tied for first place – 's Alcazar with "Not a Sinner Nor a Saint", and 's Nuša Derenda with "Prvič in zadnič", with both having received 215 points. The current tie-break rules of the time were used in this case, with the country having received the most 12 points winning the contest. In this case Sweden had received 13 sets of 12 points, compared to Slovenia's 6 sets, and so the victory went to Alcazar. Had the current tie-break rules been used, with the country receiving points from the most number of countries winning, Sweden still would have won, due to both countries receiving points from 23 countries. The first nul points received in the Second Chance Contest were received during this contest, with both 's Botnleðja and 's Lior Narkis receiving no points from the 23 juries.

The OGAE Second Chance Contest 2004 was the eighteenth edition of the Second Chance Contest, organised once again by OGAE Sweden following their win in 2003. Twenty-one songs competed in the contest, held in Växjö, Sweden. All competing branches of OGAE participated in voting for the winner, along with three guest juries who were ineligible to compete in the contest from France, Ireland and Italy.  made its début, which they also did at the Eurovision Song Contest 2004. ,  and  returned to the contest after being relegated from the Eurovision Song Contest 2003.  and  returned after holding internal selections the previous year, while  returned after being disqualified the previous year. A number of countries also withdrew from the contest;  and  had been set to compete in the contest, however withdrew at a late stage after selecting their entries (namely "Homme" by Maarja-Liis Ilus and "Freedom" by David D'Or respectively).  withdrew due to no national final being held, while  withdrew out of choice.

The OGAE Second Chance Contest 2005 was the nineteenth contest held in Bilbao, Spain after Davinia won the 2004 contest with "Mi obsesión". Twenty-four countries competed in the contest for the title of the best song that didn't make it to the Eurovision stage through their national selection, however  were later disqualified as it could not be reached to give their votes for the contest. Two guest juries also voted from Italy and Portugal, giving a total number of twenty-five juries. Poland and Portugal were forced to withdraw after internal selections were held in their countries. The contest was won by 's Alcazar with "Alcastar", who received 201 points, 24 more than runner-up .  came last, receiving nul points from all juries.

The OGAE Second Chance Contest 2006 was the twentieth edition of OGAE Second Chance, and was held in Stockholm, Sweden after Alcazar won the 2005 contest with "Alcastar". Nineteen countries competed in the contest for the title of the best song that didn't make it to the Eurovision stage through their national selection. Six guest juries also competed in the voting from Italy, Andorra, France, Bosnia and Herzegovina, Spain and from the Rest of the World.  entered the contest for the first time, while  and  returned after their absence the previous year, all holding national finals to select their entries to the Eurovision Song Contest 2006. However a large number of countries failed to hold national finals or simply withdrew from the contest.  withdrew from the 2006 Eurovision Song Contest, and were thus ineligible to compete in Second Chance. The contest was won by 's Saša Lendero with "Mandoline", who received 220 points, 45 points more than runner-up .  received nul points from all juries, placing last.

The OGAE Second Chance Contest 2007 was the twenty-first contest, which was held in Ljubljana, Slovenia after their win at the 2006 contest. Twenty countries competed in the contest for the title of the best song that didn't make it to the Eurovision stage through their national selection. However 22 had signed up to compete.  were forced to withdraw their entry, "Your Place or Mine" by Olia Tira, after no national final performance could be available.  were disqualified after the country's branch was expelled from the OGAE Network on 17 September 2007, and as such their entry, "Olet uneni kaunein" by Johanna Kurkela, did not participate in the contest. Seven guest juries also competed in the voting, namely Italy, Andorra, Rest of the World, Austria, Belgium, Lebanon and Moldova (after their withdrawal). ,  and  made their returns to the contest after missing last year's contest.  withdrew after no national final was held in the country while  were forced to withdraw after the country was dissolved in 2006. Its successor, however made its début to the contest this year. The contest was won by 's Måns Zelmerlöw with "Cara Mia", who received 252 points from the 27 juries, 72 points more than runner-up .

The OGAE Second Chance Contest 2008 was the twenty-second OGAE Second Chance Contest, organised between members of international Eurovision Song Contest fan club OGAE to select the best song not to make it to the Eurovision Song Contest through their national finals. Twenty-one songs competed for the title in the 21st edition of the contest, held in Stockholm in Sweden after OGAE Sweden's win the previous year with Måns Zelmerlöw and "Cara Mia". All twenty-one competing countries voted for the winner, and were also joined by eight guest juries from countries ineligible to participate in the contest – these guest juries came from OGSE branches in Andorra, Austria, France, Italy, Lebanon, Luxembourg, the Netherlands and Kazakhstan (representing the Rest of the World). The  withdrew after an internal selection was held in the country, while  withdrew of choice. The contest was won by 's Sanna Nielsen with "Empty Room", who received 268 points, 90 points more than runner-up . Nielsen went on to represent  at the Eurovision Song Contest 2014, with the song "Undo". This was Sweden's 12th win in the contest, remaining the most successful country in the contest.  came last, gaining nul points from all juries.

The OGAE Second Chance Contest 2009 was the twenty-third OGAE Second Chance Contest, organised between members of international Eurovision Song Contest fan club OGAE to select the best song not to make it to the Eurovision Song Contest through their national finals. The contest was held in Stockholm, Sweden after Sanna Nielsen won for Sweden the previous year. Twenty countries participated in the contest, with songs that failed to win their televised national selections.  was to originally compete with "Avalon" by Georgina & Ruth Casingena, however OGAE Malta has since decided to withdraw.  and  entered the contest for the first time, while the  returned after their absence from the 2008 contest.  returned after a 14-year absence, last entering in 1993 contest. The Slovak song was also representing OGAE Rest of the World, representing countries with no national OGAE branch. The ,  and  left the contest due to not holding a multi-song national final for the 2009, but voted as guest juries, along with Austria, France, Italy and Turkey.  were also absent from the contest.  withdrew from being a Guest Jury on 2 September 2009. The draw for the running order was conducted on 19 June 2009 in Gävle, where it was decided that newcomer Andorra would start the show, while Portugal would close it. The contest was won by 's Hera Björk with "Someday", who received 257 points, 28 points more than runner-up . This was Denmark's second win in the contest.  placed last, receiving 4 points. The full result of the Second Chance Contest were presented on 22 December 2009 through a PDF file sent to the competing OGAE clubs. The voting show on DVD will be released during early 2010.

2010s
The OGAE Second Chance Contest 2010 was the twenty-fourth contest, which were held in Copenhagen, Denmark after Hera Björk won the previous year. The results of OGAE Second Chance Contest 2010 were announced by OGAE Denmark on 31 October 2010 at 3pm CET over a live Internet stream. 's Timoteij were the winners of the contest with "Kom", giving Sweden their 13th win in the contest. 2nd place went to 's Bryan Rice and 3rd place went to 's Catarina Pereira.  came last with 0 points.

The OGAE Second Chance Contest 2011 was the twenty-fifth contest, which were held in Gothenburg, Sweden after their in 2010. ,  and the  took part as guest juries during the voting. On 10 October 2011 OGAE Sweden announced the results of the 2011 Second Chance Contest: Iceland's Yohanna, representing OGAE Rest of the World with "Nótt" was announced as the winner – their first win in the contest. Sweden's Jenny Silver came second, while Modà feat. Emma came in 3rd for Italy. Macedonia came in last with 0 points.

The OGAE Second Chance Contest 2012 was the twenty-sixth held in Johannesburg, South Africa after Yohanna won for the Iceland, represented by OGAE Rest of the World with "Nótt", in 2011. Nineteen countries competed in the contest. Italy, Israel and Poland, along with Andorra, France, Luxembourg and the United Kingdom were lined up to be guest juries during the voting. The voting took place over five days from 16 October 2013. Spain's Pastora Soler was declared the winner with the song "Tu vida es tu vida", beating Sweden's Danny Saucedo into 2nd place by a single point. Norway's Reidun Sæther took 3rd place. This is the first time that the winner is also a contestant in the respective ESC edition.

The OGAE Second Chance Contest 2013 were the twenty-seventh held on 5 October 2013 in Barcelona, Spain after Pastora Soler won the previous year. Fifteen countries competed in the contest.

The OGAE Second Chance Contest 2014 was the twenty-eighth edition of the Second Chance Contest, held in Oslo, Norway on 19 October 2014 following their win in the 2013 contest. The contest was won by Helena Paparizou, who represented  with the song "Survivor", beating  into second place, and  into third. Paparizou previously represented  at the Eurovision Song Contest 2005 with the song "My Number One" which went on to win the contest.

The OGAE Second Chance Contest 2015 was the twenty-ninth edition of the contest, and took place in Stockholm, Sweden, following their win in 2014. Eighteen countries competed and the competing entries were revealed on 9 July 2015.

The OGAE Second Chance Contest 2016 was the thirtieth edition of the contest, and took place in Siena, Italy, following their win in 2015. Twenty-three countries competed and the competing entries were revealed on 5 July 2016. ,  (as part of OGAE Rest of the World),  and  all returned to the contest. Although  was disqualified at the Eurovision Song Contest 2016, it could still participate in the Contest, and also return having withdrawn in 2015. The contest was won by Margaret, who represented  with the song "Cool Me Down", beating  into second place, and  into third.

The OGAE Second Chance Contest 2017 was the thirty-first edition of the contest, and took place in Warsaw, Poland, following their win in 2016. Twenty-two countries competed and the competing entries were revealed on 31 May 2017. (as part of OGAE Rest of the World),  and  all returned to the competition. The contest was won by Mariette, who represented  with the song "A Million Years", beating  into second place, and  into third.

The OGAE Second Chance Contest 2018 was the thirty-second edition of the contest, and took place in Eskilstuna, Sweden, following their win in 2017. The contest was won by Annalisa, who represented  with the song "Il mondo prima di te", beating  into second place and  into third. This was Italy's second win in 4 years.

The OGAE Second Chance Contest 2019 was the thirty-third edition of the contest, and took place in Udine, Italy, following their win in 2018. Although  withdrew at the Eurovision Song Contest 2019, it could still participate in the contest. The contest was won by Seemone, representing , with the song "Tous les deux", beating  into second place and  into third. This was France's first victory.

2020s
The OGAE Second Chance Contest 2020 was the thirty-fourth edition of the contest, and took place in the cities of Paris, Lille and Limoges, France following their win in 2019. Despite the cancellation of the Eurovision Song Contest 2020 due to the COVID-19 pandemic, the OGAE went ahead with organising an edition of the Second Chance Contest in 2020. Twenty-two countries took part in the contest and the competing entries were revealed on 28 June 2020. This is the second time in the history of the competition, after the 2001 edition, that the host country is unable to send an entry to compete, since the nation's chosen act for Eurovision was selected through an internal selection. Sweden took its 17th victory overall with "Kingdom Come" by Anna Bergendahl, beating Finland and Italy into second and third place respectively.

The OGAE Second Chance Contest 2021 was the thirty-fifth edition of the contest, and took place in Stockholm, Sweden, following their win in 2020. Fourteen countries took part in the contest and the competing entries were revealed on 21 May 2021. ,  and  all returned to the competition. Norway took its fourth victory with "Monument" by Keiino, setting a new points record. Sweden and Italy rounded out the top three.

The OGAE Second Chance Contest 2022 was the thirty-sixth edition of the contest, and took place in Oslo, Norway, following their win in 2021. Twenty-seven countries took part in the contest and the competing entries were revealed on 24 May 2022. Sweden took its 18th victory overall with "In i dimman" by Medina, with Finland and Spain rounding out the top three.

Winners

By contest

Retrospective Second Chance Contest

Second Chance Contest

By country

By language

Hostings

Guest Jury Hits
The Guest Jury Hits contest was introduced in 2003, giving guest juries of the Retro contests the opportunity to compete in their own contest. The contest was formed as a way for OGAE branches to become juries in the Second Chance Retro Contest, with each non-competing branch selecting a hit song from their country in that year.  The first contest was held in 2003, when hit songs from 1986 competed in the contest. So far eleven contests have been held, with Italy winning six contests, the United States won twice, and Belgium, Spain, Sweden, Ukrainian Soviet Socialist Republic, and Jamaica  all winning once. Umberto Tozzi has so far been responsible for three of Italy's wins.

See also 

 ABU Song Festivals
 Bundesvision Song Contest
 Cân i Gymru
 Caribbean Song Festival
 Eurovision Dance Contest
 Eurovision Song Contest
 Eurovision Young Dancers
 Eurovision Young Musicians
 Intervision Song Contest
 Junior Eurovision Song Contest
 OGAE
 OGAE Video Contest
 Sopot International Song Festival
 Turkvision Song Contest

Notes and references

Notes

References

External links
 

Second Chance Contest
Song contests